William John Brown (13 September 1894 – 3 October 1960) was a British trade unionist,  politician and Member of Parliament (MP).

Life
Brown grew up in Margate in Kent and served as general secretary of the Civil Service Clerical Association from 1919 to 1942.  He joined the Labour Party and stood for several seats before he was elected at the 1929 general election as a Labour MP for Wolverhampton West.  In 1931, he resigned the Labour whip, and joined the New Party led by Oswald Mosley.  However, the following day, he resigned from the New Party and thereafter sat as an independent.

Election history

He returned to Parliament at a wartime by-election in 1942.  David Margesson the Conservative MP for Rugby and Secretary of State for War had been dismissed from his ministerial job after the loss of Singapore to the Japanese, but was ennobled as Viscount Margesson. The major parties had an agreement not to contest by-elections in seats held by any of their members, but Brown stood as an independent candidate in the Rugby by-election on 29 April, and was returned as the independent MP for Rugby.

Brown was re-elected at the 1945 general election as an Independent MP against both Conservative and Labour opposition. 

However, at the 1950 general election, he stood again as an independent, but came third with 20% of the vote. The seat was gained for Labour by James Johnson.

In 1951 he ran against Edith Summerskill at Fulham West, with the Conservatives standing aside for him. He lost narrowly.

Notes

References

External links 
 

1894 births
1960 deaths
Labour Party (UK) MPs for English constituencies
Independent members of the House of Commons of the United Kingdom
Independent politicians in England
UK MPs 1929–1931
UK MPs 1935–1945
UK MPs 1945–1950
General Secretaries of the Civil and Public Services Association
People from Margate
Civil servants in the General Post Office
Civil servants in the Ministry of Works